François Simon may refer to:

 François Simon (cyclist) (born 1968), former French road bicycle racer
 François Simon (food critic) (born 1953), author and food critic for French daily Le Figaro
 François Simon (actor) (1917–1982), Swiss film actor
 François C. Antoine Simon (1844–1923), President of Haiti, 1908–1911
 François Joseph Simon, better known as Michel Simon, (1895-1975) French actor